An orthonormal function system (ONS) is an orthonormal basis in a vector space of functions.

References

Linear algebra
Functional analysis